Frederick Maitland Innes (11 August 1816 – 11 May 1882) was Premier of Tasmania from 4 November 1872 to 4 August 1873.

The son of Francis Innes, army officer, and his wife Prudence, née Edgerleyan, Innes was born in Edinburgh, Scotland. Innes was educated at Heriot's, Edinburgh, and Kelso Grammar School in Kelso. On leaving school he was employed by his uncle, manager of estates for his relation, the Duke of Roxburghe. In 1836, Innes emigrated to Tasmania where he arrived in Hobart in 1837, joining the Hobart Town Courier. A few years later he returned to Great Britain, and contributed to the press in London, and to the Penny Cyclopaedia.

Innes again went to Tasmania in 1843 and was associated with the Observer and other papers at Hobart.  In about the year 1846 he was working as a journalist at Launceston and later took up farming. With the introduction of responsible government he was elected in September 1856 as the member for Morven in the Tasmanian House of Assembly. He was colonial treasurer in four successive ministries, the first William Weston, the Francis Smith, the second Weston, and the Thomas Chapman, from 25 April 1857 to 1 November 1862, and colonial secretary from 1 November 1862 to 20 January 1863. He had now become a member of the Tasmanian Legislative Council, in 1864 was elected chairman of committees, and from 1868 to 1872 president of the council. He then resigned his seat and re-entered the house of assembly.

On 4 November 1872, allying himself with some members he had previously opposed, Innes became premier and colonial secretary until 4 August 1873, when the Alfred Kennerley ministry came in and Innes found himself isolated. In March 1875 rather to the surprise of his former friends he joined this ministry as colonial treasurer, and held this position until July 1876. He then retired from the house of assembly, was elected to the legislative council in September 1877, and in 1880 was again made president of the council. He died at Launceston on 11 May 1882. In 1838, he married a Miss Sarah Elizabeth (‘Lysbeth’) Grey—the daughter of free settlers—who survived him with sons and daughters.

Innes, an able man of moderate views, was an excellent treasurer. When he first took office the finances of the colony were in a very serious condition, and he carried a heavy burden during his five and a half years of office.

References

 

The Mercury, Hobart, 13 May 1882;
J. Fenton, A History of Tasmania;
J. H. Heaton, Australian Dictionary of Dates.

1816 births
1882 deaths
Premiers of Tasmania
Colonial Secretaries of Tasmania
Presidents of the Tasmanian Legislative Council
Leaders of the Opposition in Tasmania
Treasurers of Tasmania
People educated at Kelso High School, Scotland
19th-century Australian politicians
Scottish emigrants to colonial Australia